Dent (known previously as Dent the Future) is an annual conference in Santa Fe, NM (originally Sun Valley, ID), founded by Jason Preston and Steve Broback. Participants gather in March to "explore the magic and science of visionary leadership and groundbreaking success." Dent VIII will be held in March 2021; 2020 saw the conference go on hiatus.

Speakers and presenters
Presenters at Dent have included:
 Cathie Black
 Harper Reed
 Alvy Ray Smith
 Kathryn Minshew
 Craig Newmark
 Virginia Postrel
 David Risher

References

Further reading
 Beyond dreary politics: Denting the future in Sun Valley - David Horsey, The Los Angeles Times
 9 Conferences in 2015 That Are Worth Your Time and Money—Meredith Fineman, Entrepreneur Magazine

External links
 
 Request an invitation
 The Dent Video Library

Recurring events established in 2013
Academic conferences
Technology conferences
Business conferences
Cultural conferences
International conferences
Annual events in Idaho